Melville Municipal Airport  is located  east of Melville, Saskatchewan, Canada.

See also 
 List of airports in Saskatchewan

References 

Registered aerodromes in Saskatchewan
Melville, Saskatchewan
Cana No. 214, Saskatchewan